Woman on Board (Swedish: En kvinna ombord) is a 1941 war drama film directed by Gunnar Skoglund and starring Edvin Adolphson, Karin Ekelund and Hampe Faustman. It was shot at the Centrumateljéerna Studios in Stockholm. The film's sets were designed by the art director Bibi Lindström.

Cast
 Edvin Adolphson as 	Kapten Åkesson
 Karin Ekelund as 	Ingrid
 Hampe Faustman as  Martin Frost 
 Sten Larsson as 	Anton Stillman
 Sigge Fürst as Förste styrman
 Knut Burgh as Andre styrman 
 Åke Grönberg as Andersson
 Gunnar Sjöberg as 	Blomqvist
 Björn Berglund as Fredlund
 Julia Cæsar as 	Mammy 
 Emil Fjellström as 	Blom
 Tom Walter as 	Jacobson
 Wiktor Andersson as 	Boman
 Artur Rolén as	Jansson
 Yngve Nyqvist as	Mäster
 Gunnar Höglund as 	Maskineleven
 Per Bergström as 	Berggren
 Nils Karlsson as 	Henrikson

References

Bibliography 
 Qvist, Per Olov & von Bagh, Peter. Guide to the Cinema of Sweden and Finland. Greenwood Publishing Group, 2000.

External links 
 

1941 films
Swedish drama films
1941 drama films
1940s Swedish-language films
Films directed by Gunnar Skoglund
Swedish black-and-white films
1940s Swedish films